Jonslund is a locality situated in Essunga Municipality, Västra Götaland County, Sweden. It had 293 inhabitants in 2010. The area has a school, kindergarten and public bathing quarters. As the community grew, Jonslunds school was built in 1965.

References 

Populated places in Västra Götaland County
Populated places in Essunga Municipality